Adrianus (Gr. ) was a Greek poet who wrote an epic poem on the history of Alexander the Great, which was called the Alexandriad. What is chiefly known of this poem comes from a mention of the seventh book in the Suda, but only a fragment consisting of one line survives.

References

Cultural depictions of Alexander the Great
Ancient Greek epic poets